Norbert Elliott (born 6 November 1962) is a Bahamian athlete. He competed in the men's triple jump at the 1988 Summer Olympics and the 1992 Summer Olympics.

References

External links
 

1962 births
Living people
Athletes (track and field) at the 1982 Commonwealth Games
Athletes (track and field) at the 1987 Pan American Games
Athletes (track and field) at the 1988 Summer Olympics
Athletes (track and field) at the 1992 Summer Olympics
Bahamian male long jumpers
Bahamian male triple jumpers
Olympic athletes of the Bahamas
Commonwealth Games competitors for the Bahamas
Pan American Games competitors for the Bahamas
World Athletics Championships athletes for the Bahamas
Place of birth missing (living people)
Central American and Caribbean Games medalists in athletics